Knut Nordholm (24 August 1904 – 5 January 1981) was a Swedish fencer. He competed in the team sabre event at the 1936 Summer Olympics.

References

External links
 

1904 births
1981 deaths
Swedish male sabre fencers
Olympic fencers of Sweden
Fencers at the 1936 Summer Olympics
People from Scania